Auden Grogins (born February 5, 1962) is an American politician who served in the Connecticut House of Representatives from the 129th district from 2009 to 2015.

References

1962 births
Living people
Democratic Party members of the Connecticut House of Representatives